Badi-al Zaman Mirza Safavi was a Safavid prince, who was the son of prominent military leader Bahram Mirza Safavi, who was the youngest son of Ismail I, the founder of the Safavid empire.

Badi-al Zaman had two brothers named Ibrahim Mirza and Sultan Husayn Mirza. When Badi-al Zaman's father died in 1549, he, along with his other siblings were taken care of by Tahmasp, who even announced Badi-al Zaman as his own son. Badi al-Zaman was appointed as the governor of Sistan in 1557, and married Pari Khan Khanum (who was at that time 10 years old). However, since she was Tahmasp's favored daughter, she was not allowed to go alongside her husband to Sistan. According to the other historians, however, Pari Khan Khanum was only engaged to Badi al-Zaman, which according to Gholsorkhi seems more believable. Allegedly the marriage went no farther, since Pari Khan Khanum chose a bureaucratic life in the capital, alongside her father, over married life in Sistan.

On 26 March 1577, Badi-al Zaman Mirza was assassinated in Qandahar on the orders of shah Ismail II (r. 1576–77).

References

Sources 
 
 
 
 

Safavid princes
16th-century births
1577 deaths
People from Sistan
Safavid governors
16th-century people of Safavid Iran